Lorentzon is a Swedish surname that may refer to
Albin Lorentzon (born 1986), Swedish ice hockey player 
Inga-Britt Lorentzon (1936–1987), Swedish Olympic high jumper
Martin Lorentzon (born 1969), Swedish businessman
Susanne Lorentzon (born 1961), Swedish Olympic high jumper, daughter of Inga-Britt
Tanja Lorentzon (born 1971), Sweden-Finnish actress